Slide on This is the title of Ronnie Wood's fifth solo album. It failed to chart in US, but went to sell 58,000 copies there according to Soundscan. In Japan, it charted for four weeks in the top 100, reaching #54 and selling 21,000 copies. The final track, "Breathe On Me", is a remake from a song that originally appeared on Wood's 1975 solo album, Now Look.

Track listing 
All tracks composed by Ronnie Wood and Bernard Fowler, except where indicated.

 "Somebody Else Might"
 "Testify" (George Clinton, Deron Taylor)
 "Ain't Rock and Roll"
 "Josephine"
 "Knock Yer Teeth Out" (Wood, Fowler, Julian Lloyd)
 "Ragtime Annie (Lillie's Bordello)" (Trad.)
 "Must Be Love" (Jerry Williams)
 "Fear for Your Future"
 "Show Me" (Williams)
 "Always Wanted More" [Duet with Joe Elliott]
 "Thinkin'"
 "Like It"
 "Breathe on Me" (Wood)

Personnel
Ronnie Wood - vocals, guitar, acoustic bass, harmonica
The Edge - additional guitar
Doug Wimbish - bass
Ian McLagan - piano
Chuck Leavell - piano, Hammond organ B-3
Bernard Fowler - keyboards, drum programming, vocals
Sean Garvey - accordion, squeezebox
Felim Gormley - saxophone
Sergei Erdenko,  Colm McCauchey, Oleg Ponomarev - fiddle on "Ragtime Annie (Lillie's Bordello)" and "Always Wanted More"
Michael Kamen - string arrangements, production
Charlie Watts - drums
Simon Kirke - drums
Wayne P. Sheehy - drums
Joe Elliott - vocals on "Always Wanted More"

Ronnie Wood albums
1992 albums
Continuum Records albums